Baudouin of Ninove was a Flemish historian active around 1294. His Chronicon runs from the birth of Christ to that year.

References

Chroniclers from the Holy Roman Empire
Flemish historians
Year of death unknown
Year of birth unknown